Vancouver City Savings Credit Union, commonly referred to as Vancity, is a member-owned financial co-operative headquartered in Vancouver, British Columbia, Canada.

History
Vancity began operations in 1946 as an open-bond credit union in Vancouver, British Columbia, Canada. Initially a financial co-operative consisting of 14 Vancouver residents, Vancity has grown to serve British Columbia's Lower Mainland and the Victoria region of Vancouver Island.

On September 28, 1946, 14 Vancouver residents signed a charter to establish an open-bond credit union that would be open to any resident of the city, regardless of social affiliation. On October 11, 1946, Vancouver City Savings Credit Union opened to the public. By the end of 1946, total assets were $2,966.

Vancity first operated out of a former machine shop on the corner of Broadway and Quebec streets in Vancouver. By the end of 1951, membership had reached 2,000. Assets grew rapidly after the introduction of personal chequing accounts in the same year, reaching $5million in 1962, $10million in 1965, $100million in 1973, and $1billion by 1980. , current assets are $22.9billion.

Milestones
Vancity has a history of innovation in the North American financial services market:
 1946: the first financial institution to provide mortgages for properties in Vancouver's working class east end.
 1959: the first financial institution in Canada to offer open mortgages.
 1961: the first financial institution in British Columbia to provide mortgages to women without a male co-signer.
 1967: the first financial institution in Canada to offer a daily interest savings account, calculating interest earnings on a daily basis. 
 1980: the first financial institution in Canada to offer an all-in-one banking statement. 
 1986: offers Canada's first socially responsible mutual fund, the Ethical Growth Fund. 
 1988: the first financial institution in Canada to offer a Registered Education Savings Plan.
 1991: the first credit union in Canada to acquire a trust company, Citizens Trust Company. 
 1997: the first financial institution in Canada to establish a branchless bank, Citizens Bank of Canada. 
 2002: the first financial institution in Canada to market to the gay and lesbian community through mainstream advertising.
2008: the first financial institution in North America to become carbon neutral.
2010: the first financial institution in Canada to join the Global Alliance for Banking on Values.
2011: the largest organization in Canada (at the time) to adopt a Living Wage policy.
2014: one of the first mainstream financial institutions to launch an alternative to payday loans for its members, the Vancity Fair & Fast Loan™.
 2017: Citizens Bank of Canada renamed Vancity Community Investment Bank (VCIB).
 2019: VCIB acquired CoPower, a sustainable investment platform that issues green bonds and funds loans for clean energy and energy efficiency projects.
 2022: Vancity becomes the first Canadian financial institution to set real estate emissions reduction targets.

List of directors 
 Robert Arthur Williams (1983–1995, 2007–2016)

Services
Vancity's primary lines of business include retail and business banking (deposit-taking and lending) and mortgage lending. Through wholly owned subsidiaries, Vancity also operates foreign exchange, life insurance, Visa credit cards, real estate development, and investment advisory services

Membership
Vancity is a member of Central 1 Credit Union and is registered with the Credit Union Deposit Insurance Corporation of British Columbia. In December 2010, Vancity joined the Global Alliance for Banking on Values (GABV).

References

External links

Financial services companies established in 1946
1946 establishments in British Columbia
Credit unions of British Columbia
Ethical banking
Companies based in Vancouver